Oscar Mauricio Mercado (born December 16, 1994) is a Colombian–American professional baseball outfielder in the St. Louis Cardinals organization. He has played in Major League Baseball (MLB) for the Cleveland Indians / Guardians and Philadelphia Phillies. He represented the Colombian national baseball team at the 2017 World Baseball Classic.

Early life
Mercado was born in Cartagena, Colombia. His father, Oscar Sr., played soccer and worked as a general contractor. He has an older brother, Juan, and a twin sister, Nathalia. His family emigrated to the United States when he was seven years old on his father's work visa, and settled in Tampa, Florida.

Mercado attended Gaither High School in Tampa, Florida. He committed to play college baseball at Florida State University.

Professional career

St. Louis Cardinals
The St. Louis Cardinals selected Mercado in the second round, with the 58th overall selection, of the 2013 MLB draft. He signed with the Cardinals, receiving a $1.5 million signing bonus.

After signing, Mercado made his professional debut with the Gulf Coast Cardinals of the Rookie-level Gulf Coast League, batting .209 with one home run and 14 runs batted in (RBIs) in 42 games played. In 2014, he played for the Johnson City Cardinals of the Advanced Rookie-level Appalachian League, where he hit .224 with three home runs, 25 RBIs, and 26 stolen bases in 60 games, and in 2015, he played with the Peoria Chiefs of the Class A Midwest League, where he compiled a .254 batting average with four home runs, 44 RBIs, and 50 stolen bases in 117 games. In 2016, he played for the Palm Beach Cardinals of the Class A-Advanced Florida State League, where he switched from playing shortstop to outfielder. There, he batted .215 with 27 RBIs and 33 stolen bases in 125 games.

Mercado played for the Colombian national baseball team in the 2017 World Baseball Classic. He spent the 2017 season with the Springfield Cardinals of the Class AA Texas League, where he slashed .287/.341/.428 with 13 home runs, 46 RBIs, and 38 stolen bases in 120 games. After the season, the Cardinals assigned Mercado to the Surprise Saguaros of the Arizona Fall League (AFL). Mercado appeared in a total of 22 games for the Saguaros, posting a .264 batting average with 11 RBIs and six stolen bases. The Cardinals added him to their 40-man roster after the AFL was over to protect him from being chosen in the Rule 5 Draft. Mercado began 2018 with the Memphis Redbirds of the Class AAA Pacific Coast League.

Cleveland Indians / Guardians
On July 31, 2018, the Cardinals traded Mercado to the Cleveland Indians in exchange for Conner Capel and Jhon Torres. He was assigned to the Columbus Clippers of the Class AAA International League and finished the season there. In 132 games between Memphis and Columbus, he slashed .278/.349/.390 with eight home runs, 47 RBIs, and 37 stolen bases. He began the 2019 season with Columbus.

The Indians promoted Mercado to the major leagues on May 14. He made his major league debut that day versus the Chicago White Sox.

Overall with the 2020 Cleveland Indians, Mercado batted .128 with one home run and 6 RBIs in 36 games.
On June 21, 2022, Mercado was designated for assignment by the Guardians.

Philadelphia Phillies
The Philadelphia Phillies claimed Mercado off of waivers on June 27, 2022. After appearing in only one game with the Phillies, Mercado was designated for assignment on July 1.

Cleveland Guardians (second stint)
The Cleveland Guardians claimed Mercado off of waivers on July 3, 2022. He was designated for assignment once again on July 11, 2022. After clearing waivers, Mercado was outrighted to the minor leagues on July 14, 2022. He elected minor league free agency on November 10, 2022.

St. Louis Cardinals (second stint)
Mercado signed a minor league contract to return to the St. Louis Cardinals organization on November 18, 2022.

Personal life
Mercado became an American citizen in 2018.

References

External links

1994 births
Living people
Baseball players from Tampa, Florida
Cleveland Guardians players
Cleveland Indians players
Colombian emigrants to the United States
Columbus Clippers players
Gulf Coast Cardinals players
Johnson City Cardinals players
Major League Baseball outfielders
Major League Baseball players from Colombia
Memphis Redbirds players
Palm Beach Cardinals players
Philadelphia Phillies players
Sportspeople from Cartagena, Colombia
Peoria Chiefs players
Springfield Cardinals players
Surprise Saguaros players
2017 World Baseball Classic players
2023 World Baseball Classic players